Moskovsky City District, is one of the eight districts of the city of Nizhny Novgorod, Russia. Moskovsky District had existed since 1970. Between 1956 and 1970, the territory of today's Moskovsky District was part of the Sormovsky City District, meaning that during that time the Sormovo Airfield was actually within the Sormovsky District.

References

City districts of Nizhny Novgorod